Carrie Morgridge (born 1967) is an American philanthropist and author. She is vice-president of the Morgridge Family Foundation, funded by an annual grant from John P. and Tashia Morgridge's TOSA Foundation. The foundation's contributions have been in the hundreds of millions of dollars, with a particular focus on improving education, as well as health, the arts and the environment. Her book Every Gift Matters advocated the idea that even small gifts can have a big impact if done properly.

Early life 
Morgridge grew up in a low-income family in Santa Barbara, California. She worked at a grocery store and learned to "pinch pennies," as her family was living "paycheck-to-paycheck". She graduated summa cum laude from the International Academy of Design and Technology. Her first marriage ended quickly; she was married and divorced by age 21. She owned and sold a chain of tanning salons in California and was credited as being a "savvy businesswoman". In addition, she finished eleven Ironman Triathlon competitions. In 1991 she married John Morgridge, the son of Cisco Systems former CEO John Morgridge.

Morgridge Family Foundation 

Morgridge learned the basics of philanthropy while working at the Aspen Valley Foundation, the Aspen Institute, and the Aspen Santa Fe Ballet. She and her husband founded the nonprofit Morgridge Family Foundation in 2008. The foundation is funded by an annual grant from John P. and Tashia Morgridge's TOSA Foundation, established by Morgridge's parents-in-law.

While the Morgridge Family Foundation contributes to 185 projects per year, a few of them are what Morgridge calls "mega-gifts". For example, the foundation contributed $15 million to National Jewish Health, a Denver-based medical research facility. In appreciation of that gift in 2013, National Jewish Health established the Morgridge Educational Campus, which includes the Morgridge Academy for chronically ill children, and the Morgridge Fellowship Program. The foundation gave $4 million to the Mile High United Way Morgridge Center for Community Change. The foundation also gave $10 million to the University of Denver to establish the Morgridge College of Education. It donated $8 million to Denver Museum of Nature and Science, which was described in the Denver Post as being the largest bequest in the museum's 109-year history. It gave $3.5 million to create the Denver School of Science and Technology. A major project the foundation has sponsored is "Share Fair Nation" which trains teachers to use new classroom technologies such as whiteboards, and which brings teachers together so they can share their teaching strategies. The foundation donated substantially to Colorado Mountain College.

Author
Morgridge claims that one of the hardest tasks of being a philanthropist is rejecting requests. She believes in teaching students to be generous, creating youth philanthropy clubs, and was quoted as saying that "small gifts, given properly, do matter." This was a prominent idea in her book Every Gift Matters. According to The New York Times, the foundation typically gives gifts to major programs that last only three years. As a philanthropist, she likes to meet beneficiaries in person. She prefers to contribute to projects which involve "something new", such as interactive classroom whiteboards and laptops and other technologies for the classroom.

Morgridge was a recipient of Urban Legend Award (2015); Frances Wisebart Jacobs award (2010); Urban Peak (2015); Hope Award (2015); and Josef Korbel Humanitarian Award (2016).
and the National Jewish Health Arthur B. Lorber Award for Distinguished Service, the institution's highest honor.

Morgridge and her husband have two children. She lives in Florida and Colorado.

References

External links 
 Interview with KUSA TV (2015)
 Kids saying 'thank you' (2015)
 Interview with DITV reporter (2015)
 Thank yous from Plymouth State University (2015)
 Interview (2013)
 Presentation in Douglas County

Living people
American philanthropists
Writers from Colorado
Writers from Santa Barbara, California
People from Aspen, Colorado
People from Miami-Dade County, Florida
American women philanthropists
Patrons of schools
Philanthropists from Colorado
American women writers
1967 births
American female triathletes
21st-century American women